The Brabanthallen (literally "Brabant Halls") is a convention center in 's-Hertogenbosch, Netherlands. Every year, it hosts several exhibitions, conferences, trade fairs, concerts and other big events. It is the third largest convention center in the Netherlands, after RAI Amsterdam and Jaarbeurs Utrecht.

External links

 Official website

Convention centres in the Netherlands
Buildings and structures in 's-Hertogenbosch
Rijksmonuments in North Brabant